Midakegn is one of the woredas in the Oromia Region of Ethiopia. It is part of the West Shewa Zone. It was part of Cheliya woreda. The woreda is bordered on the east by Naannawa Ambo, on the south by Toke Kutaye, on the southwest and west by Cheliya, and on the north by Horo Guduru Welega Zone.

Demographics 
The 2007 national census reported a total population for this woreda of 79,580, of whom 39,205 were men and 40,375 were women; 2,078 or 2.61% of its population were urban dwellers. The majority of the inhabitants said they were Protestant, with 46.79% of the population reporting they observed this belief, while 36.71% of the population practiced Ethiopian Orthodox Christianity, and 15.34% practiced traditional religions.

Notes 

Districts of Oromia Region